Mähren is an Ortsgemeinde – a community belonging to a Verbandsgemeinde – in the Westerwaldkreis in Rhineland-Palatinate, Germany.

Geography

The community lies in the Westerwald between Montabaur and Westerburg. Mähren is a residential village and belongs to the Verbandsgemeinde of Wallmerod, a kind of collective municipality.

History
In 1508, Mähren had its first documentary mention as Mern.

Politics

The municipal council is made up of 6 council members who were elected in a majority vote in municipal elections every 5 years.

Since 2007, Volker Solbach has been the mayor of Mähren. He took over from Josef Ortseifen.

Economy and infrastructure

Right near the community runs Bundesstraße 8, linking Limburg an der Lahn and Hennef. The nearest Autobahn interchange is Montabaur on the A 3 (Cologne–Frankfurt), some 13 km away. The nearest InterCityExpress stop is the railway station at Montabaur on the Cologne-Frankfurt high-speed rail line.

References

External links
 Mähren 
 Mähren in the collective municipality’s Web pages 

Municipalities in Rhineland-Palatinate
Westerwaldkreis